Goraknath Temple is a Hindu temple located in the Gorkhatri area of Peshawar in Khyber Pakhtunkhwa, Pakistan. The temple is dedicated to Guru Gorakhnath who founded the kanphata Jogi order at Tilla Jogian in the first century BC. The temple was built in 1851.

History
Goraknath Temple is one of the few surviving Hindu temples in Peshawar, along with Kalibari Mandir and Dargah Pir Ratan Nath Jee, Jhanda Bazaar. The Peshawar High court ordered the Evacuee Trust Property Board to open this temple (or mandir) as a result of the petition filing by the daughter of the temple priest.

Following the reopening of the temple, it was attacked three times in the following two months. In the third such attack, the attackers burnt the pictures of gods inside the temple and took away the idols, the Statuette of Lord Shiva was smashed to pieces and the holy Gita was burnt down.

See also

 Hinduism in Pakistan
 Evacuee Trust Property Board
 Hinglaj Mata
 Katasraj temple
 Krishna Mandir, Lahore
 Multan Sun Temple
 Prahladpuri Temple, Multan
 Sadh Belo
 Shivaharkaray
 Shiv Mandir, Umerkot
 Shri Varun Dev Mandir
 Tilla Jogian

References

External links
 
 Evacuee Trust Property Board (ETPB) website

Hindu temples in Peshawar
Hindu temples in Khyber Pakhtunkhwa